Camille Marchetta (born September 15, 1940), a former London literary agent, is a novelist, television writer and producer best known for her work on 1980s prime time soap operas Dallas, Dynasty and Falcon Crest.

Biography
Born and raised in Brooklyn, New York to an Italian American family, Marchetta attended the College of New Rochelle in New Rochelle, New York, where she later received a BA in English literature. After a trip to England, she decided to stay and took up residence there. While in England she worked with Richard Hatton Limited where she later became a literary director for the company.

Career
Prior to writing for the 1980s soap opera Dallas she wrote a screenplay for a television movie that was never produced, along with one episode for the short running series Lucan. On Dallas she started as a freelance writer and eventually made her way on to the writing staff, responsible for writing major story and plot lines. She also created some of the characters on the show. After Dallas she worked on Dynasty, Falcon Crest and Nurse.

Published works
Marchetta has authored three novels:

 Lovers And Friends, 48 pages (Paperback), Publisher:Pocket Books, Reprint edition, Publication date:03/02/1995.
 The River By Moonlight, Published by: Virtualbookworm.com, 376 pages, Publication date: 08/01/2007.
 The Wives Of Frankie Ferrarro, Published by: St. Martin's Press, 12/08/2015. Sold by: Macmillan Publishers.

References

External links

Living people
1940 births
American writers of Italian descent
Writers from Brooklyn
Television producers from New York City
American women screenwriters
American women novelists
20th-century American novelists
21st-century American novelists
College of New Rochelle alumni
20th-century American women writers
21st-century American women writers
Novelists from New York (state)
Screenwriters from New York (state)
American women television producers
American expatriates in England